Wszyscy Jesteśmy Lesbijkami (We Are All Lesbians) is the third album released by Polish punk rock band Anti Dread.

Track listing
italicised titles in brackets are translated from Polish.
 "Zabawka" (Toy)
 "Zanim świat runie w gruzy" (Before the World Falls to Pieces)
 "Reklamówka z Netto" (Bag from Netto)
 "Zniszczyłaś mnie" (You Have Destroyed Me)
 "Tajna Armia" (Secret Army)
 originally performed by Cock Sparrer
 "Moja droga życia" (My Way of Life)
 "Roko"
 "On płonie w Tobie" (He Burns Inside You)
 "Włoski automat" (Italian Automate)
 "Muszę ją mieć" (I've Got to Get Her)
 "Mam erekcję" (I Have Erection)
 originally performed by Turbonegro
 "Zgubiłem mózg" (I've Lost My Brain)
 "Dupy i forsa" (Pussy and Money)
 originally performed by The Dictators

Personnel
Paweł Czekała - guitar
Kanister - drums
Andrzej - vocals
Cl-Boy - guitar
Mirosław Lipniewski - bass guitar

External links
  Anti Dread official website
  Jimmy Jazz Records

2007 albums
Anti Dread albums
Polish-language albums